Beverley Cressman is a British actress, best known for being the first person cast as Kate Lethbridge-Stewart. She appeared in two unofficial direct-to-video Doctor Who spin-offs, Downtime (1995), and Dæmos Rising (2004).

Career 
Cressmain was trained as an actor at the Guildford School of Acting. In 1995, Cressman played Kate Lethbridge-Stewart in the Reeltime Pictures film Downtime. The film also starred Nicholas Courtney as the Brigadier and Elisabeth Sladen as Sarah Jane Smith. In 1999, Cressman appeared as a driving instructor in the TV series Grange Hill. In the same year Cressman played Debbie Hunter in the Pig Heart Boy episode Losing It. Cressman played the role of Kate Lethbridge-Stewart again in the 2004 film Dæmos Rising. She starred in this film alongside her then husband Miles Richardson. In 2012, the then current Doctor Who production team decided to re-introduce Cressman's character. The role was re-cast and given to Jemma Redgrave. In 2018 it was announced that Cressman would reprise her role as Kate Lethbridge-Stewart in the Reeltime drama film Anomaly.

Cressman also works as a voice over artist and a QVC guest presenter. Furthermore, she voiced Clarissa Jones in Big Finish's Death and the Daleks and Doctor Carnive in The Mirror Effect.

Personal life 
In 1994 Cressman married Miles Richardson. As of 2005 the couple had two sons. In 2009 the couple were divorced. As of August 2015 Cressman lives in Warwickshire along with her three sons.

Filmography

Film

TV series

Audio plays

References

External links
 

British film actresses
Place of birth missing (living people)
Year of birth missing (living people)
British television actresses
20th-century English actresses
21st-century English actresses
Living people